Gustave or Gustav Mueller may refer to:
Gustave A. Mueller (1863–1912), American homeopath and surgeon
Gussie Mueller (1890–1965), American jazz clarinetist
Gustav Adolph Mueller (1864–1937), German-American architect
Gustav Emil Mueller (1898–1987), philosopher
Gustav Mueller (gymnast), American Olympic gymnast

See also
Gustave Moeller (1881–1931), American painter
Gustav Müller (disambiguation)